is a passenger railway station in located in the city of Katano, Osaka Prefecture, Japan, operated by the private railway company Keihan Electric Railway.

Lines
Kawachi-mori Station is a station of the  Keihan Katano Line, and is located 6.1 kilometers from the terminus of the line at Hirakatashi Station.

Station layout
The station has two ground-level opposed side platforms connected by an underground passage.

Platforms

Adjacent stations

History
The station was opened on October 21, 1930.

Passenger statistics
In fiscal 2019, the station was used by an average of 11,320 passengers daily.

Surrounding area
The area around the station is a residential area.
 
 Second Keihan Highway

See also
List of railway stations in Japan

References

External links

Official home page 

Railway stations in Osaka Prefecture
Railway stations in Japan opened in 1930
Katano, Osaka